Of the judges of the Supreme Court of South Australia, 14 had previously served in the Parliament of South Australia Edward Gwynne, Sir Richard Hanson, Randolph Stow, Sir Samuel Way, Sir James Boucaut, Richard Andrews, Sir William Bundey, Sir John Gordon, Robert Homburg, Sir Angas Parsons, Sir Charles Abbott, Leo Travers, Len King and Robin Millhouse. In addition, Sir John Jeffcott served as a member of the South Australian Legislative Council concurrent with his brief tenure as a judge in South Australia.

See also
 Judiciary of Australia

Notes

References

Judges of the Supreme Court
South Australia
List